Liviu Ciobotariu (born 26 March 1971) is a Romanian professional football coach and former player who is the head coach of Romanian club FC Voluntari. His son Denis is also a footballer.

Club career
Ciobotariu debuted in Divizia A with Progresul București in 1992.

International career
Ciobotariu made his debut for the Romania national team in 1997 against Macedonia, and represented his country at the 1998 FIFA World Cup and Euro 2000. He played his last international match in 2001, and got 32 caps and 3 goals in total.

Managerial career
Ciobotariu retired in 2005 and began to coach in 2006. Between July 2011 and April 2012, he was the manager of Dinamo București. In January 2015, he took control of ASA Târgu Mureș. Ciobotariu brought the team to the first position in Liga I, but failed to win the championship after two losses in the last two games of the 2014–15 season. At the end of the season, Ciobotariu ended his contract with ASA on mutual agreement.

On 4 June 2015, he was appointed as head coach of Saudi Professional League side Al-Faisaly, before moving to Al-Ta'ee in 2017. After one season, Ciobotariu was appointed manager of Botoșani.

On 3 June 2019, Ciobotariu was named manager of the Lebanon national team. After coaching for 10 games, on 17 June 2020 the Lebanese Football Association (LFA) decided not to extend Ciobotariu's contract, which had expired.

On 15 January 2021, Ciobotariu was appointed head coach of Liga I club Hermannstadt, signing a two-year contract. He was dismissed on 21 March after winning only one game out of 12. He became head coach of fellow Liga I side Voluntari on 7 May 2021.

Career statistics

International 

Romania score listed first, score column indicates score after each Ciobotariu goal.

Honours

Player
Progresul București
Divizia C: 1989–90
Divizia B: 1991–92
Cupa României runner-up: 1996–97

Dinamo București
Divizia A: 1999–00
Cupa României: 1999–00, 2004–05

Manager
FC Voluntari
Cupa României runner-up: 2021–22

Individual
Gazeta Sporturilor Romania Coach of the Month: August 2021

References

External links

 
 
 
 
 

1971 births
Living people
People from Giurgiu County
Romanian footballers
Association football central defenders
FC Progresul București players
CS Pandurii Târgu Jiu players
FC Dinamo București players
Standard Liège players
R.A.E.C. Mons players
Royal Antwerp F.C. players
Liga I players
Liga II players
Belgian Pro League players
Romania international footballers
1998 FIFA World Cup players
UEFA Euro 2000 players
Romanian football managers
FC Progresul București managers
FCM Dunărea Galați managers
CS Otopeni managers
FC Internațional Curtea de Argeș managers
CS Pandurii Târgu Jiu managers
AFC Dacia Unirea Brăila managers
FC Dinamo București managers
FC Politehnica Iași (2010) managers
FC Vaslui managers
ASA 2013 Târgu Mureș managers
Al-Faisaly FC managers
Al-Ta'ee managers
FC Botoșani managers
Lebanon national football team managers
FC Hermannstadt managers
FC Voluntari managers
Liga I managers
Saudi Professional League managers
Saudi First Division League managers
Romanian expatriate footballers
Romanian expatriate football managers
Expatriate footballers in Belgium
Expatriate football managers in Saudi Arabia
Expatriate football managers in Lebanon
Romanian expatriate sportspeople in Belgium
Romanian expatriate sportspeople in Saudi Arabia
Romanian expatriate sportspeople in Lebanon